Lilian Edirisinghe (born 19 May 1922 – died 26 December 1993 as ලිලියන් එදිරිසිංහ) [Sinhala]), was an actress in Sri Lankan cinema, stage drama and television. One of the earliest pillars in Sri Lankan film history, Edirisinghe had a career that spanned more than four decades primarily in villain and comedy roles.

Personal life
Edirisinghe was born on 19 May 1922 in Imbulgoda area as the seventh of a family with 11 siblings. Her father Lewis Edirisinghe was a farmer and mother Kalu Kankanamge Podi Nona was a housewife. She attended to Parakandeniya Vidyalaya, Kossinna currently known as Perakumbadeniya Maha Vidyalaya. She started to act in school dramas and is a die hard fan of Laxmi Bhai. She married in 1942 and the couple gave birth to a son - Ranjith, who died after two months of age. Her husband also died soon after.

Acting career
Edirisinghe moved to Colombo with her family, where she started to practice dancing under renowned dance master Mohammad Gauss Master. In 1940, Under Gauss Master, she also studied drama and was able to act in the stage drama Bihisunu Lanka. Then she acted in the drama Raaja Poronduwa where she continued to act more than 300 times.

Filmography
Edirisinghe started her film career with B.A.W. Jayamanne's 1954 film Iranganie. In the film she acted as a teacher. Then she continued to act in more than 150 films across many genre. Some of her popular acting came through films such as Ara Soyza, Sihina Sathak, Kolamkarayo and Chandi Shyama.
 
 No. denotes the Number of Sri Lankan film in the Sri Lankan cinema.

Awards and Accolades
 Won Deepashika Award in 1968 for playing the most number of films of the year.

Sarasaviya Film Festival

|-
|| 1967 ||| Daru Duka || Merit Award ||

References

External links

1993 deaths
Sri Lankan film actresses
Sinhalese actresses
1922 births
Sri Lankan stage actresses
Sri Lankan television actresses